Earnest William "Larry" Newman (1902–1963) was a rugby union player who represented Australia.

Biography
Newman was born in Marrickville, New South Wales, to Ernest and Lilly Newman, and he attended Newington College (1909–1921). In sport at Newington he played in the cricket 1st XI for six years, three as captain, and the rugby 1st XV for four years, two as captain. He was a member of the 1st rifle shooting for two years and the athletics team and won the Warry Cup as senior champion in 1921.

Representative Rugby
He was a wing and claimed 1 international rugby cap for Australia.

References

1902 births
1963 deaths
Australian rugby union players
Australia international rugby union players
People educated at Newington College
Rugby union players from Sydney
Rugby union wings